Ezatollah Janmaleki  is an Iranian football defender who played for Iran. He also played for Taj SC.

References

External links
 
 Ezatollah Janmaleki at TeamMelli.com

Iran international footballers
Iranian footballers
Living people
Esteghlal F.C. players
Footballers at the 1974 Asian Games
Asian Games gold medalists for Iran
Asian Games medalists in football
1947 births
Association football defenders
Medalists at the 1974 Asian Games
20th-century Iranian people